Mouhamed Khay Lejouade was born on 1 December, 1999. He is a Mauritanian footballer who plays as a midfielder for ASC Tidjikja and the Mauritania national team.

International career
Lejouade made his debut for Mauritania on 12 October, 2018 against Angola.

Career statistics

International
Statistics accurate as of match played 12 October 2018

References

External links
 
 

1999 births
Living people
Mauritanian footballers
Mauritania international footballers
Association football midfielders
Mauritania A' international footballers
2022 African Nations Championship players